Muhammad Safdar Shakir (born 13 January 1952) is a Pakistani politician who had been a member of the Provincial Assembly of the Punjab from August 2018 till January 2023.

Early life 
He was born on 13 January 1952 in Mamu Kanjan, Pakistan.
His family  belongs to a very religious background. his father started SOAP manufacturing business as"KHAJOOR SOAP" factory.

Political career
He was elected to the Provincial Assembly of the Punjab as a candidate of Pakistan Muslim League (N) from Constituency PP-104 (Faisalabad-VIII in 2018 Pakistani general election.

References

Living people
Pakistan Muslim League (N) MPAs (Punjab)
1952 births